Hemptown Creek is a stream in the U.S. state of Georgia. It is a tributary to the Toccoa River.

Hemptown Creek takes its name from the village of Hemp, Georgia, also called Hemptown.

References

Rivers of Georgia (U.S. state)
Rivers of Fannin County, Georgia